Apasionada is the 21st album and 18th studio album of Puerto Rican singer Ednita Nazario. It was released on June 21, 2005.

Track listing
 "Vengada"
 "Ni Héroes Ni Vencidos"
 "Por Hoy"
 "A Que Me Pides Más"
 "A Mí Si Que No"
 "Sobrevivo"
 "Agua Profunda"
 "Olvidarte"
 "Mariposa"
 "Una Y Otra Vez"

Singles
 "Vengada"
 "Ni Heroes Ni Vencidos"
 "A Que Pides Más"

Personnel
 Produced by Ednita Nazario and Tommy Torres

Ednita Nazario albums
2005 albums